Events in the year 2017 in Slovakia.

Incumbents
 President – Andrej Kiska (Independent)
 Prime Minister – Robert Fico (Smer-SD)
 Speaker of the National Council – Andrej Danko

Events

Deaths

27 January – Ján Kobezda, ice hockey player (b. 1975).

3 August – Ladislav Čisárik, heraldic artist, painter and graphic designer (b. 1953)

References

 
2010s in Slovakia
Years of the 21st century in Slovakia
Slovakia
Slovakia